Gundelsheim may refer to places in Germany:

Gundelsheim, Baden-Württemberg
Gundelsheim, Bavaria